Jan Spoelder (born 14 March 1973) is a German-born Dutch former football goalkeeper.

Career

After playing youth and amateur football for Braunschweig-based club MTV Hondelage, Spoelder joined the reserve side of Eintracht Braunschweig in 1992. He was promoted to the club's first team in 1995 and went on to spend his entire professional career as back-up keeper at Eintracht Braunschweig, making 18 league appearances in ten seasons. His longest stint as starting keeper came during the 2002–03 2. Bundesliga season, when he played nine games in a row.

References

External links

1973 births
Living people
Sportspeople from Braunschweig
Dutch footballers
Dutch expatriate footballers
Dutch expatriate sportspeople in Germany
Dutch football managers
Association football goalkeepers
2. Bundesliga players
Eintracht Braunschweig II players
Eintracht Braunschweig players
Eintracht Braunschweig non-playing staff
Footballers from Lower Saxony